KBRZ-FM 89.3 FM is a radio station licensed to Victoria, Texas.  The station broadcasts a Spanish Religious format and is owned by Aleluya Broadcasting Network.

References

External links
KBRZ-FM's official website

BRZ-FM
Victoria, Texas
BRZ-FM